The Bell Hotel is an AA 3-star hotel in the English town of Thetford within the county of Norfolk. The hotel has been a Grade II listed building since 3 April 1951.

Location 
The hotel is located on the corner of King Street and Bridge Street in the centre of Thetford.

History 
Documentation shows that there has been an Inn on this site since 1493. The premises served as a principal coaching inn on the London to Norwich mail coach route. The two storey timber framed building which faces on to King street is the oldest part of the present building. With the arrival of the railway connections to Thetford, Norwich and wider Norfolk the inn then was turned into a hotel. In the 17th century and 19th century further wings and extensions have been added with the west wing constructed in the late 20th century. The hotel is reputedly haunted by the ghost of its 18th-century landlady Betty Radcliffe. Actors associated with the BBC comedy show Dad's Army, stayed at the hotel when filming on location

References 

Coaching inns
Grade II listed buildings in Norfolk
Grade II listed hotels
Hotels in Breckland
Hotels in Norfolk
Organizations established in the 1490s
1493 establishments in England
Thetford